

See also
 List of undefeated NCAA Division I football teams

References

Winless